Dzerzhinsky District is an administrative and municipal district (raion), one of the twenty-four in Kaluga Oblast, Russia. It is located in the northern central part of the oblast. Its administrative center is the town of Kondrovo. Population:   61,159 (2002 Census);  The population of Kondrovo accounts for 27.9% of the district's total population.

Administrative and municipal status
Administratively, the district is not divided into smaller units and has direct jurisdiction over 1 town (Kondrovo), 3 settlements of urban type, and 163 rural localities. Municipally, the territory of the district is incorporated as Dzerzhinsky Municipal District.

References

Notes

Sources

Districts of Kaluga Oblast
